Andreas Laib (born 5 January 1972) is a German lightweight rower. He won a gold medal at the 1998 World Rowing Championships in Cologne with the lightweight men's eight.

References

1972 births
Living people
German male rowers
World Rowing Championships medalists for Germany